Jacoby is a masculine given name. Notable people with the name include:

Jacoby Brissett (born 1992), American football player
Jacoby Ellsbury (born 1983), American baseball player
Jacoby Ford (born 1987), American football player
Jacobi Francis (born 1998), American football player
Jacoby Jones (born 1984), American football player
JaCoby Jones (born 1992), American baseball player
Jacoby Shaddix (born 1976), American rock singer
JaCoby Stevens (born 1998), American football player

Masculine given names